Corban University is a private Christian university in Salem, Oregon. There are about 1,200 full-time students enrolled on the Salem campus and 2,800 worldwide. Athletically, it is a member of the National Association of Intercollegiate Athletics competing in the Cascade Collegiate Conference.

History 
The institution was established in 1935 in Phoenix, Arizona as the Phoenix Bible Institute by Evangelist Leland Entrekin and Roy Bancroft. The college moved in 1946 to Oakland, California and took the name Western Baptist Bible College, affiliated with the General Association of Regular Baptist Churches (GARBC). In 1969, the college moved to Salem, Oregon. In July 1969, the administrators paid $5,000 as a down payment for the 100 acre campus. The down payment was then adopted as the college's new address: 5000 Deer Park Drive. The transaction was personally overseen and signed by then Oregon Governor Tom McCall.

The school shortened its name to Western Baptist College in 1978. In the 1970s, Western added liberal arts to its ministry programs. Dr. Thomas Younger, the college's sixth president, helped institute the two of the university's most successful schools: the School of Education and the School of Business. Dr. Reno Hoff became the president of the institution in 1999, replacing Dr. David Miller. In 2001, Beth Bartosik became the first Fulbright Scholar in school history. Corban received a $2.1 million donation in 2001 for a new performing arts center and chapel, the largest donation ever for the school.

In 2004, U.S. News & World Report ranked the school as the eighth best in the western United States for comprehensive colleges, and ninth the following year. The college name was changed from Western Baptist College to Corban College on May 7, 2005. "Corban," a Hebrew word, means "a gift dedicated to God." Later in 2005 the college opened Davidson Hall, a residence hall, and had their largest incoming class to that point with 207 freshman and an overall enrollment of 860. In 2006, U.S. News & World Report listed the school at eight, the fifth year in a row the school was in the top ten. As of 2009, the college had an endowment of about $3 million. In 2013, U.S. News Best Colleges listed Corban in its Top 10 for the West for the 13th year in a row. The university was ranked as the fifth best among western regional colleges by U.S. News & World Report in 2016.

Corban accepts Christian students.  Students are required to provide their testimony of their saving relationship with Jesus Christ in their application to Corban. In the summer of 2007, Corban's name was extended to Corban College and Graduate School in order to reflect the institution's graduate programs in education and business. In honor of the institution's 75th anniversary, the school became Corban University on May 1, 2010.

Academics  
The university contains four schools and two academic departments: the Department of Humanities, Department of Natural Science and Mathematics, Hoff School of Business, School of Education, School of Ministry, School of Social Sciences, and the Center for Global Engagement. Through these schools and departments, Corban offers over 50 undergraduate programs, 10 graduate programs, and one post graduate program. All Corban undergraduate students, regardless of major, take a minimum of 12-semester units of Bible and theology classes. All courses are taught from a biblical perspective.

Campus 

The trees are mainly Douglas Fir and Oregon White Oak with a smattering of Big Leaf Maple. The site was previously the site of the Oregon Institute for Deaf-Mutes and then the Oregon State Tuberculosis Hospital. Some buildings on campus date to those facilities. Over one hundred bird species have been identified on campus. The school also operated the Corban School of Ministry in Tacoma, Washington, after the Northwest Baptist Seminary was merged with Corban in 2010. The Tacoma campus was sold shortly after the purchase, allowing the university to expand the Salem campus and house the School of Ministry in Salem once again.

Residence halls
Freshmen and sophomores, unless over the age of 21 or are married, must live on campus. There are four residence halls: Aagard, Prewitt/Van Gilder, Balyo, and Davidson. There are also townhouses on the campus for academic juniors and seniors.

Performing Arts Center
Also on campus is the 700-seat Psalm Performing Arts Center opened in 2005 at a cost of $3.7 million. The building also houses practice rooms and classrooms for performing arts majors.

Academic buildings
The campus' main academic building, the Academic Center, houses the university's 80,000+ volume library. The library also has study rooms and conference rooms available to students throughout the day, along with multiple study areas and computer labs with free printing. Additionally, the library houses the Prewitt-Allen Archaeological Museum, with over 900 artifacts and replicas from the Middle East and Greece. The rare collection displayed also contains authentic and original scrolls of the Torah, the first five books of the Bible. The Academic Center also holds all professors offices, organized by program, with the exception of performing arts. The building also has 40-seat classrooms and science labs.

The university rarely holds classes over 50 students, with a student to faculty ratio of just 12:1. Traditional classrooms and small lecture halls are found around campus in Caulkins Hall, the David F. Miller Pavilion, Schimmel Hall, C.E. Jeffers Sports Center, Psalm Performing Arts Center, and the Younger Center. The Younger Center also houses additional study areas for students, a tutoring center, and the university Student Support Center.

Administration

The university holds most administrative offices in Schimmel Hall, a three-story building built in the late 19th century. The Office of the President, the Office of the Provost, along with academic services, financial services, enrollment, and marketing offices are all found in this building.

Athletic facilities
The C. E. Jeffers Sports Center is a multi-purpose 1,600 seat sports arena in Salem, Oregon which is home to the Corban Warriors. It was opened in 1978 and houses the basketball, volleyball, and wrestling teams.  The student section, the "Barracks", is small but passionate.  The building's namesake, Clarence E. Jeffers, was a Corban graduate, sports fanatic, and building contractor. The building also contains the campus' fitness center, a classroom, and coach and athletic trainer offices.

On the southeast side of campus is the beach volleyball courts, home to practices and games of the Corban women's beach volleyball teams.

The Outdoor Athletic Complex, which is was to completed in Spring of 2022, is the new home of the university's track, cross country, soccer, and lacrosse teams. The $4 million project, raised entirely from donations, features a state-of-the-art track and field complex, lighting, and drainage for future expansions.

Next to the Outdoor Athletic Complex lies Warrior Field, where Corban's softball team can be found practicing and competing.

Athletics
The Corban athletic teams are called the Warriors. The university is a member of the National Association of Intercollegiate Athletics (NAIA), primarily competing in the Cascade Collegiate Conference (CCC) since the 1993–94 academic year.

Corban competes in 16 intercollegiate varsity sports: Men's sports include baseball, basketball, cross country, golf, soccer, track & field and wrestling; while women's sports include basketball, beach volleyball, cross country, golf, lacrosse, soccer, softball, track & field and volleyball. The school colors are navy and gold.

Notable alumni

Patrick Daka, Zimbabwean soccer player
Elizabeth Halseth, former Nevada State Senator
Frank Prewitt, American attorney
Steve Reese, American soccer player
Sherrie Sprenger, former member of the Oregon House of Representatives

References

External links

 Official website
 Official athletics website

 
Educational institutions established in 1935
Cascade Collegiate Conference
Universities and colleges accredited by the Northwest Commission on Colleges and Universities
1935 establishments in Oregon
Council for Christian Colleges and Universities
Private universities and colleges in Oregon